The year 1530 in science and technology included many events, some of which are listed here.

Botany
 Otto Brunfels begins publication of his illustrated botanical catalogue Herbarium vivae icones, based on his own observations and giving the plants their German vernacular names.

Earth sciences
 Georgius Agricola publishes Bermannus, sive de re metallica dialogus, his first work on scientific metallurgy.

Mathematics
 Approximate date – Jyeṣṭhadeva, a member of the Kerala School of Astronomy and Mathematics in India, writes the Yuktibhāṣā, the world's first known text on the foundations of calculus.

Medicine
 The name syphilis is coined by the Italian physician and poet Girolamo Fracastoro in his epic poem, Syphilis sive morbus gallicus.
 The first book devoted to dentistry, the Artzney Buchlein, is published.

Births
 September 30 – Girolamo Mercuriale, Italian physician (died 1606)
 Mathew Baker, English shipwright (died 1613)
 1529 or 1530 – Julius Caesar Aranzi, Italian anatomist (died 1589)
 approx. date – Thomas Penny, English botanist and entomologist (died 1589)

Deaths
 Jacopo Berengario da Carpi, Italian anatomist (born 1460)

References

 
16th century in science
1530s in science